Ben Baker is a Republican politician who has served as a member of the Missouri House of Representatives from the 160th district since 2019.

Biography
Baker is a graduate and former dean of students at Ozark Bible Institute, and a former mayor and councilmember in Neosho, Missouri. He was first elected to the Missouri House in 2018, where he sits on committees for administrative rules, elementary and secondary education, downsizing state government and economic development.

In 2020, Baker proposed House Bill 2044 to "require libraries to create review boards to regulate library events and anything else in the library considered age-inappropriate sexual material".

References

Living people
Republican Party members of the Missouri House of Representatives
Year of birth missing (living people)
Ozark Christian College alumni
21st-century American politicians